Wierzchuca Nagórna  is a village in the administrative district of Gmina Drohiczyn, within Siemiatycze County, Podlaskie Voivodeship, in north-eastern Poland.

According to the 1921 census, the village was inhabited by 334 people, among whom 315 were Roman Catholic, 2 Orthodox, and 17 Mosaic. At the same time, 321 inhabitants declared Polish nationality, 1 Belarusian and 12 Jewish. There were 50 residential buildings in the village.

References

Villages in Siemiatycze County